Government College of Engineering, Srirangam is a government technical college in Sethurappatti, Srirangam, Trichy, Tamil Nadu, India. It was established in 2013 and offers courses in different engineering branches.

History 
The Tamil Nadu government has announced the proposal for Government College of Engineering, Sethurapatti, Tiruchirappalli district during the year 2013. The institute has been built completely at an estimated cost of Rs. 60.01 crore. The college has been located on 30.2 acres.

Academics 
The institute offers undergraduate courses leading to the degree of Bachelor of Engineering. The undergraduate students are admitted based on competitive student rankings in higher secondary examination.

Departments 
The institute includes the following departments:
 Computer Science Engineering
 Civil Engineering 
 Mechanical Engineering
 Electrical And Electronics Engineering
 Electronics And Communication Engineering
 English
 Physics
 Chemistry
 Maths
 Library
 Administration Department

Location 
It is located 18 km from the city of Trichy on National Highway 38. Located in Sethurappatti

References

Engineering colleges in Tamil Nadu
Educational institutions established in 2013
2013 establishments in Tamil Nadu
Universities and colleges in Tiruchirappalli